Max Johnston (born 26 December 2003) is a Scottish professional footballer who plays as a defender for Scottish Premiership side Motherwell.

Club career
Johnston signed Motherwell at 12 years old, progressing through the club's academy system, then joining up with the first-team squad ahead of the 2020–21 season. Johnston debuted for the Steelmen on 13 February 2021, as a substitute in the Lanarkshire derby versus Hamilton Academical.

On 1 September 2021, Johnston signed for Queen of the South on a season long loan deal, with the former Doonhamers manager being his father Allan. He was then loaned to Cove Rangers in September 2022. After making 10 appearances with Cove, Johnston was recalled on 1 January 2023.

International career
Johnston has represented Scotland at under-16 level, scoring on his debut versus Australia in 2019.

On 17 March 2022, Johnston was called up late to the Scotland under-19 squad.

Personal life
Johnston's father is former Scotland international Allan, and his uncle Sammy is also a former player.

Career statistics

References

2003 births
Living people
Scottish footballers
Association football defenders
Scotland youth international footballers
Motherwell F.C. players
Scottish Professional Football League players
Queen of the South F.C. players
Cove Rangers F.C. players
Scotland under-21 international footballers